Bap tehsil is a tehsil in Jodhpur District of Rajasthan state in western India. Headquarters for the tehsil is the village of Bap.

Bap tehsil is the northernmost of the eleven tehsils in Jodhpur District.  It borders Phalodi tehsil to the south, Jaisalmer District to the west and northwest, and Bikaner District to the north and east.

History
Bap tehsil was created in 2012 out of the northern part of Phalodi tehsil. Prior to that the area had been an independent sub-tehsil with its own local council (panchayat samiti).

Villages
There are thirty-two panchayat villages in Bap tehsil.

Notes

Tehsils of Rajasthan
Jodhpur district